Pagetina is a genus of crustaceans belonging to the monotypic family Pagetinidae.

The species of this genus are found in southernmost Southern Hemisphere.

Species:

Pagetina antarctica 
Pagetina genarum 
Pagetina monodi 
Pagetina reducta

References

Amphipoda